Vincent is a British television crime drama series, created and principally written by Stephen Butchard, that first broadcast on ITV on 10 October 2005.

Vincent follows the work of a private detective agency based in Manchester, run by private investigator Vincent Gallagher (Ray Winstone), who alongside his sidekick Beth (Suranne Jones), junior PI Robert (Joe Absolom) and fellow team members Gillian (Angel Coulby) and John (Ian Puleston-Davies), investigates cases which the police would either refuse to touch, or have been unable to solve. Vincent also has to deal with his arch enemy, DCI David Driscoll (Philip Glenister), who begins a relationship with his estranged wife Cathy (Eva Pope), resulting in Cathy becoming pregnant.

Following strong viewership and critical acclaim for the first series, a second four-part series was commissioned, which began transmission on 16 October 2006. Despite retaining consistent viewing figures, and Winstone's expressed interest in continuing in the role, ITV executives chose to axe Vincent following the conclusion of the second series.

The complete series was released on DVD on 13 November 2006 via ITV Studios Home Entertainment. On 25 February 2016, all eight episodes were made also made available for download on the ITV Store. Both series of Vincent were also broadcast in the United States on BBC America.

Cast
 Ray Winstone as Vincent Gallagher
 Suranne Jones as Beth Goddard
 Joe Absolom as Robert Ellison
 Angel Coulby as Gillian Lafferty
 Ian Puleston-Davies as John Thompson
 Philip Glenister as DCI David Driscoll (Series 1)
 Sandra Huggett as Roxanne (Series 1)
 Eva Pope as Cathy Gallagher (Series 1)

Episodes

Series 1 (2005)

Series 2 (2006)

References

External links

2005 British television series debuts
2006 British television series endings
2000s British drama television series
British detective television series
ITV television dramas
Television series by ITV Studios
English-language television shows
Television shows set in Manchester
Television shows produced by Granada Television
2000s British crime television series
2000s British mystery television series